WLMT (channel 30) is a television station in Memphis, Tennessee, United States, affiliated with The CW and MyNetworkTV. It is owned by Tegna Inc. alongside ABC affiliate WATN-TV (channel 24). Both stations share studios at the Shelby Oaks Corporate Park on Shelby Oaks Drive in the northeast section of Memphis, while WLMT's transmitter is located in the Brunswick section of unincorporated northeast Shelby County.

History
The station first signed on the air as WMKW-TV on April 18, 1983. It was the second independent station in the Memphis market. The "KW" in its call sign referred to Kemmons Wilson, who—along with George S. Flinn Jr.—controlled the station's original ownership group, Memphis Area Telecasters. Wilson was also the founder of Holiday Inn, which was then based in Memphis. Shortly before signing on, Memphis Area Telecasters sold the station to the TVX Broadcast Group, which at that time, owned UHF independent stations in several medium-sized markets. WMKW ran a general entertainment format featuring afternoon cartoons, sitcoms, old movies, drama shows and some sports. Right from the start, it began a viewership rivalry with fellow independent outlet WPTY-TV (channel 24, now sister station WATN-TV). In April 1987, WMKW became the market's original Fox affiliate as part of an affiliation deal involving the rest of the TVX stations, and began branding as "Fox 30" on-air. It was at this point that WMTU (now WJKT) in Jackson became a semi-satellite of WMKW.

Also in 1987, WMKW was placed up for sale by TVX to finance the company's purchase of other television stations. MT Communications bought the station in 1988, along with sister station WCAY-TV (now WUXP-TV) in Nashville and changed its call letters to WLMT on October 1, 1989. Fox pulled its affiliation from WLMT in the spring of 1990 and moved it to WPTY making WLMT an independent station once again. WMTU also continued to simulcast WLMT's programming except during prime time as WMTU remained with Fox until 1995. MT Communications sold the station to Max Media in 1992. WLMT then established a local marketing agreement (LMA) with WPTY (then owned by Clear Channel Communications), with the two stations pooling resources and programming.

The station became a charter UPN affiliate upon the network's launch on January 16, 1995, while WMTU took on the network as a secondary affiliation until later that year when Fox was taken off that station. In 2001, WLMT was bought outright by Clear Channel making WPTY and WLMT full sisters. Shortly afterwards, when The WB was picked up by WPTY, WLMT aired some Kids' WB shows, most notably Pokémon, but before then, most WB programming aired in the Memphis area on the superstation feed of Chicago's WGN-TV, as well as a special feed created by Time Warner Communications, TV Memphis. In 2003, programming from The WB moved from WPTY (where it was a secondary affiliation and shown during late night slots) to WLMT where it also aired out of pattern.

On January 24, 2006, CBS Corporation (which split from Viacom in December 2005) and Time Warner's Warner Bros. Entertainment (the division that operated The WB) announced that they would dissolve UPN and The WB, and move some of their programming to a newly created network, The CW. On February 22, 2006, News Corporation announced the launch of a new "sixth" network called MyNetworkTV, which would be operated by Fox Television Stations and its syndication division Twentieth Television. MyNetworkTV was created to compete The CW as well as to give UPN and WB stations that were not mentioned as becoming CW affiliates another option besides converting to independent stations.

WJKT declined to affiliate with The CW or MyNetworkTV choosing instead to become a separate station, rejoining Fox on August 21. The area's Ion Television owned-and-operated station, WPXX-TV (channel 50), began carrying MyNetworkTV as a secondary affiliation on September 5. Meanwhile, WLMT affiliated with The CW when the network launched on September 18 and began branding on-air as "CW 30". On April 20, 2007, Clear Channel entered into an agreement to sell its entire television station group to Newport Television, a broadcast holding company controlled by Providence Equity Partners. On March 26, 2007, it began offering Newport's Variety Television Network on a new second digital subchannel. After that service shut down in January 2009, it switched to the Retro Television Network (RTV).

The station picked up WWE Smackdown from MyNetworkTV after WPXX ended its affiliation with the network (by then a programming service) in September 2009 and aired the program at 7 p.m. on Saturday nights. Initially, WLMT did not carry any other MyNetworkTV programs and the agreement to carry WWE Smackdown ended with the broadcast's October 2010 move to cable's Syfy. At some point that month, the station began carrying MyNetworkTV on its second digital subchannel. WLMT therefore joined the handful of stations that cleared the entire CW and MyNetworkTV lineups on separate subchannels (and, by July 2011, was the only station in the country that carried The CW as a primary affiliation and MyNetworkTV as a digital multicast channel). RTV was replaced with MeTV on digital channel 30.2 (which is also carried on Comcast digital channel 911) on November 14, 2011. On July 19, 2012, Newport announced that it would sell 12 of its stations, including WLMT and WPTY, to Nexstar Broadcasting Group. The sale was finalized on December 3.

In 2013, Nexstar announced that it would move WPTY, WLMT and WJKT's operations from their existing, aging five-story building in midtown Memphis into a former MCI call center on the city's northeast side. Nexstar invested $5 million to convert the call center into a repurposed television studio facility with modern, up-to-date equipment. The move was completed on June 1. At that time on WPTY (whose calls were changed to WATN)'s new website, WLMT's presence on that site was reduced solely to schedule listings, FCC-required disclosures and a link to the CW network's website. During the move, WLMT's second subchannel temporarily ran the full MeTV schedule for several weeks while the equipment for reception of MyNetworkTV was re-established. As of October 2016, KPMF-LD (in Paragould, Arkansas) formerly assumed the MyNetworkTV affiliation (from WLMT-DT2) for the Memphis market until late 2021; as a result, WLMT-DT2 has resumed airing the full MeTV schedule. In 2018, KPMF-LD moved their transmitting operations from Marion, Arkansas to a lease with the WATN/WLMT tower.

On December 3, 2018, Nexstar announced it would acquire the assets of Chicago-based Tribune Media—which has owned CBS affiliate WREG-TV (channel 3) since December 2013—for $6.4 billion in cash and debt. Nexstar was precluded from acquiring WREG directly or indirectly while owning WATN/WLMT, as FCC regulations prohibit common ownership of more than two stations in the same media market, or two or more of the four highest-rated stations in the market. (Furthermore, any attempt by Nexstar to assume the operations of WREG through local marketing or shared services agreements would have been subject to regulatory hurdles that could have delayed completion of the FCC and Justice Department's review and approval process for the acquisition.) As such, Nexstar decided to sell WATN to a separate, unrelated company to address the ownership conflict. WLMT does not rank among the top four in total-day viewership and therefore is not in conflict with existing FCC in-market ownership rules; however, Nexstar opted to sell that station alongside WATN. On March 20, 2019, McLean, Virginia-based Tegna Inc. announced it would purchase WATN-TV and WLMT (excluding WJKT) from Nexstar upon consummation of the merger, as part of the company's sale of nineteen Nexstar- and Tribune-operated stations to Tegna and the E. W. Scripps Company in separate deals worth $1.32 billion; this would make the duopoly sister stations to NBC affiliate WBIR-TV in Knoxville and CBS affiliate KTHV in Little Rock. The sale was completed on September 19, 2019.

Programming

Sports programming
During its time as an independent station, WLMT carried St. Louis Cardinals baseball games syndicated from KPLR-TV.

From 2014 to 2018, WLMT carried programming from the syndicated ACC Network by Raycom Sports, providing coverage of Atlantic Coast Conference football and men's basketball. This replaced coverage of Southeastern Conference football and basketball from ESPN Plus-oriented SEC TV, which was run from 2009 until the launch of the cable-exclusive SEC Network in 2014. The SEC syndication package by Raycom Sports (and before that, Jefferson Pilot Sports/Lincoln Financial Sports) was run by WLMT from the 1990s until Raycom lost the rights to ESPN Plus in 2009.

In January 2018, it was announced that WLMT would air Tennessee Titans preseason games that August, taking over from long-time affiliate WMC-TV (channel 5).

News operation

WATN-TV presently produces seven hours of locally produced newscasts each week for WLMT in the form of a 9 p.m. newscast each evening.

WPTY established a news department in 1995, with newscasts debuting on December 1 of that year, after it became the market's ABC affiliate. The station also began producing nightly prime time newscast for WLMT titled NewsWatch 30 at 9. This program competed with WHBQ's new hour-long 9 p.m. newscast and was formatted with an energetic, youthful and almost "grunge" look. Several years later, WPTY rebranded its newscasts (with the WLMT newscast being renamed UPN 30 News at 9) and began modifying its format to reach a broader audience.

In 2002, WPTY (and by association, WLMT) adopted the Eyewitness News format for its newscasts. The stations' news format was modified once again to feature a harder-edged, more aggressive and often "confrontational" approach to its reporting. The change resulted in most of the original news anchors and reporters leaving or being laid-off as well as a complete overhaul in the station's imaging and presentation. The WLMT 9 p.m. newscast – which began as a half-hour newscast – expanded to a full hour around this time, with a sports highlight program filling out the final 15 minutes of the broadcast. In 2006, when WPTY launched a weekday morning newscast, the station began producing an hour-long extension of the program for WLMT that airs at 7 a.m. Shortly after the station's acquisition by Tegna, the 7 a.m. newscast was canceled and replaced with syndicated programming, leaving the 9 p.m. newscast as the only WATN-produced news programming on WLMT.

In 2009, with continued low ratings (newscasts on both stations remain far behind WREG, WMC and WHBQ in the ratings) and under control by Newport Television, the station brought in new management that led to several layoffs of on-air staffers. Gradually, WPTY and WLMT dropped most of its confrontational and aggressive reporting style. In November 2010 after eight years under the Eyewitness News brand, WPTY rebranded its newscasts yet again with WLMT's newscasts being retitled as CW 30 News, after briefly branding as ABC 24 News on CW 30. On April 29, 2012, WPTY began broadcasting its local newscasts in 16:9 widescreen standard definition, the WLMT newscasts were included in the upgrade.

On June 1, 2013, WPTY changed its calls to WATN-TV (rebranding as "Local 24") upon its move into a new studio facility. The relaunch included the introduction of a new graphics package along with a modified high-definition set originally used by then-sister station KLRT-TV in Little Rock until that station's news department was consolidated with KARK-TV earlier that year after Nexstar partner company Mission Broadcasting's 2012 purchase of that station. The WLMT newscasts remain branded as "CW 30 News". With the move, WATN (along with WLMT) became the last station in the Memphis market to begin broadcasting its newscasts and other local programming in high definition.

Technical information

Subchannels
The station's digital signal is multiplexed:

Analog-to-digital conversion
WLMT discontinued regular programming on its analog signal, over UHF channel 30, on June 12, 2009, as part of the federally mandated transition from analog to digital television. The station's digital signal remained on its pre-transition UHF channel 31, using PSIP to display WLMT's virtual channel as 30 on digital television receivers.

Out-of-market coverage
Since 1995, WLMT remained the default over-the-air WB/CW affiliate for the Jackson, Tennessee market until WNBJ-LD2 signed on The CW Plus on August 6, 2018, replacing cable-only affiliate, "WBJK".

Also, WLMT remained the default over-the-air CW affiliate for the Jonesboro, Arkansas market, until KAIT-DT3 signed on The CW Plus on September 1, 2018, replacing cable-only affiliate, "KJOS".

See also
WATN-TV

References

External links
ABC24.com - WATN/WLMT official website
MeTVMemphis.com - MeTV Memphis official website

Television channels and stations established in 1983
LMT
The CW affiliates
MeTV affiliates
Start TV affiliates
GetTV affiliates
Rewind TV affiliates
Tegna Inc.
1983 establishments in Tennessee